The Miwok are four Native American groups in Northern California.

Miwok may also refer to:

Miwok peoples

Branches
Bay Miwok
Coast Miwok
Lake Miwok
Plains and Sierra Miwok

Federally recognized tribes
Buena Vista Rancheria of Me-Wuk Indians
 California Valley Miwok Tribe
 Chicken Ranch Rancheria of Me-Wuk Indians
 Federated Indians of Graton Rancheria
 Ione Band of Miwok Indians
 Middletown Rancheria
 Shingle Springs Band of Miwok Indians
 Tuolumne Band of Me-Wuk Indians of the Tuolumne Rancheria
 United Auburn Indian Community of Auburn Rancheria
 Wilton Rancheria Indian Tribe

Languages
Miwok languages
Bay Miwok language
Coast Miwok language
Lake Miwok language
Sierra Miwok language
Northern Sierra Miwok
Central Sierra Miwok
Southern Sierra Miwok

Other uses
Miwok 100k Trail Race, an ultrarunning race
Miwok Lodge (now the Silicon Valley Monterey Bay Council), a Boy Scouts lodge
 Mi-Wuk Village, a housing development (not a tribal village)